89 Rawson Road and 86 Colbourne Crescent are two historic Shingle Style houses located in Brookline, Massachusetts.

Description and history 
The -story wood-frame house that was designed by Chapman & Frazer for Thomas Shepard, and built in 1900. It is a large Shingle-style house, with a profusion of gables and recesses, and a uniform covering of wood shingles. The house occupies a large lot on Aspinwall Hill, with commanding views of the area. Thomas Shepard worked in his father's lumber business in Boston, and was responsible for developing family-owned land in northern Brookline.

The house was listed on the National Register of Historic Places on October 17, 1985.

See also
National Register of Historic Places listings in Brookline, Massachusetts

References

Houses in Brookline, Massachusetts
Houses completed in 1900
Shingle Style houses
National Register of Historic Places in Brookline, Massachusetts
Houses on the National Register of Historic Places in Norfolk County, Massachusetts
Shingle Style architecture in Massachusetts